The Misfits are an American punk rock band often recognized as the pioneers of the horror punk subgenre, blending punk and other musical influences with horror film themes and imagery. The group was founded in 1977 in Lodi, New Jersey, by vocalist, songwriter and keyboardist Glenn Danzig. Danzig's first recruit to the Misfits was drummer Mr. Jim and bassist Diane DiPazza, however, DiPiazza never showed up. Mr. Jim was replaced by Manny Martinez shortly after. Jerry Only joined on bass guitar shortly after. Over the next six years, membership would change frequently, with Danzig and Only being the sole consistent members. During this time period, they released several EPs and singles, and with Only's brother Doyle as guitarist, the albums Walk Among Us (1982) and Earth A.D./Wolfs Blood (1983), both considered touchstones of the early-1980s hardcore punk movement. The band has gone through many lineup changes over the years, with bassist Jerry Only being the only constant member in the group.

The Misfits disbanded in 1983, and Glenn Danzig went on to form Samhain and then Danzig. Several albums of reissued and previously unreleased material were issued after the group's dissolution, and their music later became influential to punk rock, heavy metal, hard rock, and alternative rock, including high-profile acts such as Metallica, Guns N' Roses, Marilyn Manson, Green Day, the Offspring, NOFX, AFI and My Chemical Romance. After a series of legal battles with Danzig, Only and Doyle regained the rights to record and perform as the Misfits. They formed a new version of the band in 1995 with singer Michale Graves and drummer Dr. Chud. This incarnation of Misfits had more of a heavy metal sound, and released the albums American Psycho (1997) and Famous Monsters (1999) before dissolving in 2000. Jerry Only then took over lead vocals and recruited former Black Flag guitarist Dez Cadena and former Ramones drummer Marky Ramone for a Misfits 25th anniversary tour.

This lineup released an album of cover songs titled Project 1950 and toured for several years. In 2005, Marky was replaced by Robo, who had played with Black Flag in the early 1980s and had also previously been Misfits' drummer from 1982 to 1983. This lineup released a single titled "Land of the Dead" in 2009. The Misfits' lineup of Only, Cadena, and drummer Eric "Chupacabra" Arce released a new album titled The Devil's Rain in October 2011. In 2015, it was announced that Cadena would be taking a break from music after receiving a cancer diagnosis, and was replaced by Only's son Jerry Caiafa II, presented as Jerry Other. That same year Soulfly's Marc Rizzo joined the band, also playing guitar. He filled in for Cadena, before Caiafa would become the sole guitarist for the band.

In September 2016, for the first time in 33 years, Danzig, Only, and Doyle reunited for two headlining shows as the Original Misfits at that year's edition of Riot Fest, along with drummer Dave Lombardo and second guitarist Acey Slade. The Original Misfits lineup continued performing sporadically through the present.

History

1977–1978: Formation and Static Age
The Misfits were formed in 1977 in Lodi, New Jersey, by Glenn Danzig, who had previous experience performing in local cover bands. The band was named after actress Marilyn Monroe's final film, The Misfits (1961). Danzig's first recruit to the Misfits was drummer Mr. Jim and bassist Diane DiPazza, however, DiPiazza never showed up. Mr. Jim was replaced by Manny Martinez shortly after. The two practiced in Martínez's garage, with Danzig on electric piano and Martínez on drums. The duo soon encountered Jerry Caiafa, who was dating a neighbor of Martínez's and had just received a bass guitar for Christmas. Although he was still new to the instrument, he joined the band; Caiafa and Danzig would remain the only consistent members of the Misfits until the group's dissolution in 1983.

Danzig, Martínez, and Caiafa rehearsed for three months without a guitarist, using Danzig's electric piano to provide the songs' rhythm. The band played their first performance at CBGB in New York City in April 1977, followed by other local performances over the following months. In May that year, they recorded their first single, Cough/Cool, which they released through their own label Blank Records that August. Caiafa's surname was misspelled on the record's sleeve, prompting him to insist that in the future he be credited as "Jerry, only Jerry". "Jerry Only" became his pseudonym for the rest of his career. 

In August 1977, guitarist Frank Licata joined the band under the pseudonym Franché Coma, allowing Danzig to phase out the electric piano and focus on singing while pushing the band's sound in a punk rock direction. Danzig and Only deemed Martínez unreliable and was replaced by Mr. Jim. The band found a recording opportunity when Mercury Records wished to use the name Blank Records for one of its subdivisions and offered Danzig thirty hours of studio time in exchange for rights to the name. Danzig accepted, and in January 1978 the Misfits entered a New York recording studio to record 17 songs, 14 of which were mixed for the proposed Static Age album. The band were unable to find a record label interested in releasing it, so they released four of the songs in June 1978 as the Bullet single on their own label Plan 9 Records, named after the 1959 science fiction horror film Plan 9 from Outer Space. The other songs would see release on various compilation albums throughout the 1980s and 90s, but Static Age was not released in its entirety until 1997.

1978–1981: Singles and early tours
Following the Static Age sessions, the Misfits began a shift in songwriting and appearance, with Danzig writing more songs inspired by B horror and science fiction films. He painted skeletal patterns on his performance clothing, while Only began applying dark makeup around his eyes and styling his hair in a long point hanging from his forehead between his eyes and down to his chin, a style that became known as a "devilock" and which both Danzig and Only's brother Doyle would eventually adopt. This new style and musical direction would later be described as the subgenre "horror punk".

The band performed more frequently and embarked on short tours in support of the Bullet single. While in Canada in October 1978 Coma quit the band because he did not enjoy touring, and guitarist Rick Riley filled in temporarily to finish the tour. Mr. Jim also quit following the tour, citing a distaste for the horror direction in which the band was heading. Within two months the pair were replaced by drummer Joey Poole, under the pseudonym Joey Image, and guitarist Bobby Kaufhold, also known as Bobby Steele. The new lineup of Danzig, Only, Image, and Steele began performing in December 1978 and continued to evolve the horror elements of the band. They released the Horror Business single in June 1979, the cover of which featured a skeletal figure inspired by a poster for the 1946 film serial The Crimson Ghost.

The figure became a mascot for the band, and its skull image would serve as the Misfits' logo for the rest of their career. The band also launched a fan club named the "Fiend Club" which Danzig operated in a do-it-yourself fashion from his mother's basement in Lodi, silkscreening T-shirts, assembling records, mailing merchandise catalogs, booking shows for the band, and answering fan mail.

In June 1979, the Misfits performed as openers for The Damned in New York City. Only spoke with singer Dave Vanian about the possibility of the Misfits touring the United Kingdom with The Damned. That November the band released the Night of the Living Dead single and flew to England to tour with The Damned. Upon arriving there, however, they learned that Vanian had not taken his conversation with Only seriously and had not planned on having the Misfits on the tour. Vanian attempted to arrange for the Misfits to take part in the tour, but the band members were unhappy with the situation and left the tour after only two shows. Image then quit the band and flew back to the United States. With their return flight not scheduled until late December, the remaining band members stayed in London. Only spent time with Sid Vicious' mother, Anne Ritchie, whom he had befriended after Vicious' death in February 1979. Danzig and Steele got into a fight with skinheads while waiting to see The Jam, were arrested, and spent two nights in jail in Brixton.  This experience inspired the later song "London Dungeon". Although in an interview on podcast San Clemente Punk, Bobby Steele tells a completely different version of the events.

Upon their return to the United States the Misfits released the Beware EP in January 1980, then took a four-month break before adding Arthur McGuckin as their new drummer under the pseudonym Arthur Googy. During this time Only's younger brother Paul Caiafa, a longtime fan of the band who went by the nickname Doyle, began learning to play guitar with help from Danzig and Only. The Misfits began working on an album which they planned to release through their Plan 9 label, recording twelve songs in a studio in August 1980. Doyle practiced with the band and loaned the band his gear for recording. That October Steele was ejected from the band, when Steele no-showed a scheduled recording session, in favor of the sixteen-year-old Doyle. Steele went on to form The Undead, while Doyle made his debut with the Misfits at their annual Halloween performance at Irving Plaza in New York City. After several more performances, the band took another hiatus for six months.

After reconvening, the band selected three of the twelve songs from their August 1980 album sessions and released them as 3 Hits From Hell in April 1981. Throughout the rest of 1981 they continued to record tracks for a full-length album, to be titled Walk Among Us. They had planned to release it through Plan 9 but instead accepted an offer from Slash Records, deciding to rework the album before its release. In October 1981 they released two more tracks from the August 1980 sessions as the Halloween single. On November 20 they recorded a performance at Broadway in San Francisco.

Black Flag were also performing that night at the Mabuhay Gardens downstairs on Broadway, and Black Flag singer Henry Rollins, a longtime fan of the band, came up to watch the Misfits' soundcheck. He stayed to watch the band's set and sang guest vocals on "We Are 138". The two bands crossed paths again on Christmas in Lodi, where Black Flag wound up playing as the opening band for the Necros and the Misfits.

1982–1983: Albums and dissolution
Walk Among Us was released in March 1982 through Ruby and Slash Records. It was the first full-length Misfits album to be properly released, and the only album to be released while the early incarnation of the band was still active. A national tour in support of the album followed, and the band's performances began to grow more intense and violent. Danzig and Googy clashed frequently during the tour, and after a heated argument at a McDonald's restaurant Danzig kicked Googy out of the band, delaying their plans to record their next EP. They offered the vacant drummer position to their friend Eerie Von, who had served as their occasional roadie and photographer, but he had already committed to drumming for Rosemary's Babies. Henry Rollins recommended former Black Flag drummer Robo, who flew to New Jersey to join the Misfits in July 1982. Doyle graduated from high school and he and Only began working full-time at their father's machine shop, earning money to purchase new instruments, fund the band's tours, and press records, while Danzig ran the Fiend Club and continued writing new songs.

In September 1982 the Misfits embarked on a national tour, with the Necros as their opening act. During the tour they stopped at a studio to record the instrumental tracks for their next EP. They were arrested in New Orleans on charges of grave robbing while attempting to locate the grave of voodoo practitioner Marie Laveau, but bailed themselves out of jail and skipped their court date to drive to their next performance in Florida. Following the tour they released seven songs from the November 1981 performance in San Francisco in limited numbers only to members of the Fiend Club as the Evilive EP.

By this time Danzig was growing increasingly dissatisfied with the Misfits and had begun writings songs for a new band project. In June 1983 he confided to Henry Rollins that he planned to quit the group. In July 1983 the Misfits finished recording their EP, and Danzig decided to record two more songs that he had intended for his new project, turning it into a full album. Earth A.D./Wolfs Blood demonstrated the increased influence of hardcore punk and heavy metal on the band, though they would break up just two months before it was released. After a series of arguments with Danzig, Robo left the band in August and Danzig became further disenchanted, beginning to audition musicians for his next project.

On October 29, 1983, the Misfits played their annual Halloween performance at Greystone Hall in Detroit with the Necros. Danzig had selected Brian Damage (real name Brian Keats), formerly of Genöcide and Verbal Abuse, as the band's new drummer. However, Damage became drunk before the show and could not play properly. After several songs Doyle escorted him off the stage and Todd Swalla of The Necros filled in for the remainder of the performance. Tensions came to a head and Danzig announced to the audience that it would be the band's final show. Upon returning to Lodi the band members went their separate ways.

1984–1995: New projects and legal battles
Following the breakup of the Misfits, Danzig launched his new band Samhain, moving away from punk rock, and toward more experimental heavy metal with a grim atmosphere. Several Misfits songs were rerecorded for Samhain albums, including "Horror Business" (as "Horror Biz"), "All Hell Breaks Loose" (as "All Hell"), and "Halloween II". In 1987, the band signed to a major record label and Danzig replaced most of the rhythm section, renaming the group Danzig. He continues to front Danzig, who have released ten albums ranging in style from blues rock-influenced heavy metal to industrial rock, and has also released two solo albums.

Jerry Only and Doyle, meanwhile, moved to Vernon, New Jersey to work at their father's machine parts factory full-time. Jerry Only had married and had a daughter and became more serious about his Christian faith, regretting some of the things he had done with the Misfits. In 1987, he and Doyle formed the short-lived Kryst the Conqueror, a Christian heavy metal band with barbarian imagery.

Although the Misfits' popularity did not extend beyond the underground punk scene during their six years of activity, public interest in the band increased in the years following their breakup. The success of Danzig's post-Misfits' work led to interest in his past work, and several high-profile rock bands professed fondness for the Misfits. Most notably, Metallica covered the Misfits songs "Last Caress" and "Green Hell" on The $5.98 E.P. - Garage Days Re-Revisited (1987), and Guns N' Roses covered "Attitude" on "The Spaghetti Incident?" (1993). Several albums of reissued and previously unreleased Misfits material were issued between 1985 and 1987, the first being the compilation album Legacy of Brutality (1985) which included many of the songs from the unreleased Static Age album. Danzig overdubbed many of the album's instrument tracks to avoid having to pay royalties to the other former band members. Misfits, more commonly referred to as Collection I, followed in 1986. The Evilive EP was reissued as a full album in 1987 with five additional tracks.

Only contacted Danzig about receiving a portion of the royalties from these albums' sales, beginning a legal battle that lasted several years and involved other past members of the band. All of the Misfits material had been credited to Danzig, and though Only later conceded that Danzig had written nearly all of the lyrics and most of the music, he contended that he and Doyle "wrote 25% or maybe 30% of the music" and deserved compensation. Danzig, however, insisted that he had written all of the songs in their entirety and that the other members' creative input had been minimal. Eventually Only ceased his pursuit of songwriting credits and sought the rights to use the Misfits name and imagery, including the now-famous "Crimson Ghost" skull face logo.

In 1995, the parties reached an out-of-court settlement that allowed Only and Doyle to record and perform as the Misfits, sharing merchandising rights with Danzig. Collection II, a third compilation of Misfits songs, was released later that year.

1995–2000: Reformation and new lineup

Only and Doyle immediately set about reforming the Misfits, bringing in drummer David Calabrese, also known as Dr. Chud, who had worked with them in Kryst the Conqueror. Glenn Danzig refused to return as the band's lead singer. Dave Vanian of The Damned was also approached but declined. The band, now reformed with one original founding member, Jerry Only, held open auditions for a new vocalist. Nineteen-year-old singer Michael Emanuel had recently recorded a demo tape in hopes of starting a music career, and the owner of the recording studio suggested that he audition for the Misfits. Being unfamiliar with the band, Emanuel listened to Collection I on a walkman to learn the lyrics and melodies while working his job as a greenskeeper. He impressed the band with his audition and was accepted as the new lead singer under the pseudonym Michale Graves, while Doyle adopted the new stage full name Doyle Wolfgang von Frankenstein. The new lineup made an appearance in the 1995 film Animal Room.

In 1996, The Misfits coffin box set was released, containing nearly all of the band's Danzig-era material recorded from 1977 to 1983 (with the exception of Walk Among Us). The set included the incomplete fourteen-song Static Age album, released for the first time in its entirety on CD, as well as the overdubbed and alternate versions of songs that had previously been released on Legacy of Brutality, Collection I, and Collection II. Static Age was also released as a separate album the following year, including all seventeen tracks that had been recorded during the January 1978 sessions. The release of the box set and Static Age made the Misfits' complete early catalog widely available for the first time.

A tribute album was also released in 1997 titled Violent World: A Tribute to the Misfits, featuring numerous punk rock and hardcore bands covering their songs. Another tribute album, Hell on Earth: A Tribute to the Misfits, was released in 2000 featuring death metal, hard rock, and gothic rock acts.

The new incarnation of the Misfits released their debut album American Psycho in 1997. They filmed music videos for the songs "American Psycho" and "Dig Up Her Bones". The band toured Europe and North America in support of the album and appeared as characters in World Championship Wrestling. Graves took a hiatus from the band in 1998, during which Myke Itzazone of Empire Hideous filled in as singer during tours of South America and Europe. After Graves' return the band signed to Roadrunner Records, releasing Famous Monsters in October 1999 and filming a music video for the single Scream! They made additional film appearances in Big Money Hustlas (2000), Bruiser (2000), and Campfire Stories (2001) and continued to tour, but tensions between the band members began to grow. During a performance at the House of Blues in Orlando, Florida on October 25, 2000, Graves and Chud both quit the band and walked off stage. The two later released an album under the name Graves before splitting up; Graves went on to sing for Gotham Road and then launched a solo career, while Chud formed Dr. Chud's X-Ward. Meanwhile, Doyle took an indefinite hiatus from performing as he divorced, remarried, had a fourth child, and dealt with tendonitis in his elbow.

2001–2008: 25th anniversary and all-star lineup
As the sole remaining founding member of the Misfits, Jerry Only took over lead vocal duties in addition to playing bass guitar and recruited veteran musicians Dez Cadena, former guitarist of Black Flag, an idea Doyle was not fond of, leading him to quit. Also Marky Ramone, former drummer of the Ramones, joined for a Misfits 25th anniversary tour which lasted intermittently for nearly three years. Former Black Flag and Misfits drummer Robo filled in for Ramone during some stretches of the tour. Only released Cuts from the Crypt in 2001, a compilation of demos and rarities covering the band's period with Graves and Chud from 1995 to 2001. This fulfilled the band's contractual obligations to Roadrunner Records, whom Only had grown dissatisfied with.

Also in 2001 Caroline Records announced that they would release recordings from the Misfits' August 1980 album sessions as 12 Hits from Hell. However, both Only and Glenn Danzig abruptly called off production of the album, citing concerns with the mixing, mastering, layout, and packaging.

Only and longtime collaborator John Cafiero soon launched their own label, Misfits Records, and released a split single featuring the Misfits and Japanese horror punk band Balzac. The Only/Cadena/Ramone lineup of the Misfits released the covers album Project 1950 in 2003, performing renditions of classic rock and roll songs from the 1950s and 1960s. The album featured guest appearances from Ronnie Spector, Jimmy Destri, Ed Manion, and John Cafiero. The band toured intermittently in support of the album until 2005, when Ramone left the band and was replaced by Robo. They booked a full European tour that year, but problems with Robo's visa led to the cancellation of all dates in the United Kingdom. A rescheduled UK tour followed in September.

Doyle had meanwhile reunited with Glenn Danzig, joining Danzig onstage during performances in December 2004 to play guitar for 30-minute sets of old Misfits songs midway through the band's setlist. It was the first time the two had performed together in over twenty years, and the first time Doyle had performed since his hiatus. Danzig called the performances "the closest thing to a Misfits reunion anyone is ever going to see". These sets featuring Doyle continued through Danzig's 2005 Blackest of the Black tour and 2006 Australian tour. Glenn Danzig had announced his intention to retire from touring following these, though he later contradicted this by announcing a Danzig 20th anniversary tour in 2008. In 2007, he produced Doyle's new project Gorgeous Frankenstein. Doyle later indicated that plans had been in place for the Misfits to reunite with Glenn Danzig beginning in 2002, but that Jerry Only and his manager had "put a fuckin' monkey wrench in it."

2009–2015: 30th anniversary and new albums
In 2009 and 2010, the Misfits performed an extended 30th anniversary world tour. A new single, "Land of the Dead" was released October 27, 2009, marking the band's first release of new studio material in six years and the only release by the lineup of Only, Cadena, and Robo. Robo was dismissed from the band in 2010, with Only explaining that ongoing problems with his Colombian passport inhibited the band's ability to tour consistently. He was replaced by Eric "Chupacabra" Arce of Murphy's Law, who had previously filled in with the band for tours in 2000 and 2001. The Only/Cadena/Arce lineup released a new album, The Devil's Rain, recorded with producer Ed Stasium and titled after the 1975 film starring William Shatner. The album was released on October 4, 2011. During the latter quarter of 2011, former vocalist Danzig and guitarist Doyle performed Misfits songs on four occasions as part of the Danzig Legacy tour. The first of the four shows, which took place on October 7 in Chicago, saw a sold-out crowd.

In 2013, the Misfits released their third live album, Dead Alive!. In October, they released a 12" single fronted by a new recording of "Descending Angel", backed by a cover of "Science Fiction/Double Feature", a song they previously only played live. Meanwhile, Danzig and Doyle continued to regularly play Misfits songs and included a set on Danzig's 25th anniversary tour. In October 2013, publisher Rowman & Littlefield published This Music Leaves Stains by James Greene, an unofficial Misfits biography, which tells the story of each incarnation of the band as well as spin-off projects such as Samhain and Danzig. In late 2015, the Misfits released the songs "Vampire Girl" and "Zombie Girl" as a single.

2016–present: Reunion as the Original Misfits
In May 2016, Danzig, Only, and Doyle announced that they would perform together for the first time in 33 years, under the name The Original Misfits. Only told Rolling Stone that the reunion stemmed from a legal discussion that "was turning into another court battle and it turned into a reunion." Court documents show that Danzig and Only discussed a reunion as part of settlement negotiations as early as 2014. In June of that year, the Misfits released the Friday the 13th EP featuring material written by Only with his son Jerry Other on guitar and Chupacabra on drums. In September the Misfits lineup of Danzig, Only and Doyle, along with drummer Dave Lombardo and guitarist Acey Slade, headlined their two reunion shows, performing 25-song sets at the Riot Fest in Chicago and Denver.

In an interview with Rolling Stone following the first reunion show Only was asked about the future of the Misfits, and if there were plans to continue and possibly record new music. "I want it to continue. I know Doyle wants it to continue. I know Glenn wants it to continue. We just have to be big-enough people to make it continue. And that's where we're at. Whatever it takes. We're going into our 40th anniversary so the timing couldn't be more perfect. Eventually Doyle's got to write a new album; I've got to write a new album; Glenn's got to write a new album. Why don't we work together and make the greatest album ever? Now we've got different elements. We've got Doyle playing more of a metal kind of thing. We've got Dave, who we're trying to figure out what the fuck he's doing. And Glenn's got his own thing. And Acey (Slade, second guitar) fills in good, too. And I've got the band where it is today. So it's a matter of re-molding and using all the different elements that I've got." When asked if Danzig would want to record new music Only said, "I think it's got to evolve naturally. The thing is we've tried to plan things, and then we stand there and wait, and as it comes we'll just do it. When we go back – I don't know about Glenn – but I canceled our touring and everything for this, so I'm going to go home and write and lift."

In December 2017 the reunited lineup performed two concerts at the MGM Grand Garden Arena in Las Vegas and The Forum in Inglewood, California. In 2018, the band played at the Prudential Center in Newark, New Jersey and in 2019 at the Allstate Arena in suburban Chicago. In a June 2019 interview, Danzig indicated that the reunion period might be drawing to a close, saying that, "We're not gonna do many more." The news from Danzig came on the heels of an in-depth article from MetalSucks analyzing legal documents related to the original reunion planning that revealed other details, including the statement, "The parties agree to perform no fewer than ten Misfits reunion shows to coincide with the 40th anniversary of the band." Despite Danzig's pessimism, it was announced that same month that the Original Misfits would be replacing Megadeth at the Psycho Las Vegas event in August due to Dave Mustaine's throat cancer diagnosis. Following the Las Vegas show, the reunited lineup was booked for concerts at the Fiddler's Green Amphitheatre in Greenwood Village, Colorado, at the Oracle Arena in Oakland, at Seattle's White River Amphitheatre, at New York's Madison Square Garden, at Philadelphia's Wells Fargo Center and at Discovery Park in Sacramento.

In May 2021, it was announced that the Original Misfits would play Riot Fest as co-headliners with My Chemical Romance alongside Nine Inch Nails.

In August 2022, they announced an Original Misfits lineup would perform its second headlining show of 2022 on Halloween weekend in Dallas, at Dos Equis Pavilion on October 29, with special guests Alice Cooper and FEAR.

Style
Each incarnation of the Misfits has made use of horror film and science fiction film-inspired themes and imagery, with makeup, clothing, artwork, and lyrics drawn from B movies and television serials, many from the 1950s through 1970s. Musically the band are often recognized as progenitors of the horror punk and psychobilly subgenres and have drawn from punk rock, heavy metal, and 1950s rock and roll and rockabilly to inform their style. Rolling Stone describes them as "the archetypal horror-punk band of the late 1970s and early '80s", and they are considered icons in punk music and culture.

The early incarnations of the Misfits are associated with the hardcore punk movement of the early 1980s, though American Hardcore: A Tribal History author Steven Blush notes that "though crucial to the rise of hardcore, [they] were in fact in a league of their own...The Misfits delivered a hyper-yet-melodic assault based in 50/60s-style rock, taking the Buddy Holly/Gene Vincent foundation and making it nuclear." Jon de Rosa of Pitchfork Media describes how the band's sound was different from the punk rock coming out of New York at the time: "New York punk was just punk, simple and static. When Glenn started the Misfits, he mutated the punk sound and image into something darker and more sinister, a punk-metal hybrid that later found bloom in the quiet, boring suburbs of Oslo and the boggy backwaters surrounding Tampa. Punk belonged to the media/celebrity hubs of London and New York. Ghoul rock was for the kids in the suburbs where nothing ever happens."

Andy Weller of the Necros recalls the band's transition from traditional punk rock in the late 1970s to hardcore in the early 1980s: "(You) could hear it on the records. It went from this Ramones-type stuff, to nine months later, where they put out records that were so fast it's unreal." By the recording of Earth A.D./Wolfs Blood the band were playing faster, more aggressive material. According to Blush, "The Misfits' strengths as a hardcore group lay in non-[hardcore] attributes–melodic songs and larger-than-life-aura–but by the time of Earth AD Glenn was writing hyperspeed blasts that sounded very standard."

The new version of the Misfits launched by Jerry Only and Doyle in the 1990s had a style that was a little different from older Misfits songs. Reviewing American Psycho, Stephen Erlewine of AllMusic called the new incarnation "a kitschy goth-punk outfit that relies more on metal than hardcore", while Rolling Stone remarked that the band's new style blended "some old-style punk, a little metal and an occasional all-out thrasher." Greg Prato, reviewing the 2001 album Cuts from the Crypt, noted that "the latter-day Misfits are much more heavy metal based than in their earlier work – as their punk roots have all but been erased." The Misfits have also been described as pop punk.

Members

Current members
 Jerry Only – bass, backing vocals (1977–1983, 1995–present), lead vocals (2001–2016)
 Doyle Wolfgang von Frankenstein – lead guitar (1980–1983, 1995–2001, 2016–present)
 Glenn Danzig – lead vocals (1977–1983, 2016–present)
 Dave Lombardo – drums (2016–present) 
 Acey Slade – rhythm guitar, backing vocals (2016–present)

Discography

Studio albums
 Walk Among Us (1982)
 Earth A.D./Wolfs Blood (1983)
 Static Age (1996) (Originally recorded in 1978)
 American Psycho (1997)
 Famous Monsters (1999)
 Project 1950 (2003)
 The Devil's Rain (2011)

Filmography
The Misfits appeared as characters or in cameos in the following movies:

 Animal Room (1995), as Misfits.
 Big Money Hustlas (2000), as Misfits 1–4 (individually credited).
 Bruiser (2000), as Misfits.
 Campfire Stories (2001), as Misfits.

See also
 List of cover versions of Misfits songs
 Horror punk

References

Bibliography

External links

 
 
 

 
1977 establishments in New Jersey
1983 disestablishments in New Jersey
1995 establishments in New Jersey
Geffen Records artists
Hardcore punk groups from New Jersey
Horror punk groups
Musical groups disestablished in 1983
Musical groups established in 1977
Musical groups reestablished in 1995
Musical groups from New Jersey
Musical quintets
American punk rock groups